Huhu Studios was an animation studio based in Warkworth, New Zealand.

History

Huhu Studios was founded in 1996 by Trevor Yaxley as a boutique animation studio for small-scale TV series' and straight-to-DVD projects. Since its inception Huhu Studios had upscaled its NZ operation while also expanding into China with two studios based in Beijing.

Most recently Huhu Studios had focussed on international co-productions. 

In 2022, Director Trevor Yaxley stated that the studio had closed because of pressures related to the COVID 19 pandemic. Although the initial intention was to mothball the studio and reopen, the length of the pandemic hindered this.

At its height, the company was employing around 100 staff.

Films

Huhu Studios has produced multiple animated shows and films, including:

VeggieTales (2009-2015)
Buzz and Poppy
Turbo Dogs
Sindbad & the 7 Galaxies 
The Ten Commandments
Fifty the Tractor
Life at the Pond
Hermie and Friends
Mosley

References

Television production companies of New Zealand
New Zealand animation studios